The Polish International in badminton is an international open held in Poland since 2012. The tournament belongs to the BE Circuit. Not to be confused with the Polish Open. The Polish International is an International Series rated tournament which is the second step on the senior ladder after Future Series. The Polish Open is one step higher at International Challenge and is played at the opposite end of the calendar year.

Previous winners

Performances by nation

References

External links
Official website

Recurring sporting events established in 2012
Badminton tournaments in Poland
International sports competitions hosted by Poland